The  Rybinsk RD-36-35 was a small lift turbojet engine, designed for use on V/STOL aircraft at the Rybinsk Engine Design Bureau (RKBM), designed by Pyotr A. Kolesov. Very little is known of this engine, probably due to confusion with the similarly designated Kolesov RD-36 and Lotarev D-36, which have little or no relation to the lift-jet.

Variants and Applications 
RD-36-35
 MiG-21PD
 Mikoyan-Gurevich 23-01 (Mikoyan Guryevich E-7PD)
 Sukhoi T-58VD
RD-36-35PR
 Bartini Beriev VVA-14
RD-36-35F
 Bartini KOR-70 (Project for high speed VTOL ship-borne floatplane Kor.S)
 Yakovlev Yak-36M
 Yakovlev Yak-38U
RD-36-35FV(izdeliye 24) 
 Yakovlev Yak-36M
RD-36-35FVR
(izdeliye 28) 
 Yakovlev Yak-38
 Yakovlev Yak-38U
RD-36-35K
Mikoyan-Gurevich MiG-105

Specifications (RD-36-35FV)

References

1980s turbojet engines
Lift jet